Frank Field (29 February 1908 – 24 May 1981) was an English cricketer who played three first-class matches for Worcestershire and Marylebone Cricket Club (MCC) between the wars. He was born in Langley, Worcestershire and died aged 73 in Stourbridge.

Field made his debut for Worcestershire against Nottinghamshire at Dudley at the end of August 1928. Worcestershire lost the match by an innings, though Field look 4-60 (his only first-class wickets) in the first innings, all lbw.
Nearly three years later he played for Worcestershire against the same opponents at Worcester, but was ineffectual in returning 0-56 from 11 overs.
Field's last appearance in first-class cricket came in June 1932, when he turned out for Marylebone Cricket Club (MCC) against Kent at Lord's: he made a pair and returned 0-78 from 18 overs.

He should not be confused with the much more famous Frank Field who had a long career with Warwickshire.

Notes

References
Statistical summary from CricketArchive
Lists of matches and detailed statistics from CricketArchive

English cricketers
Worcestershire cricketers
Marylebone Cricket Club cricketers
1908 births
1981 deaths